is a Japanese dancer and actor. He was a member of Exile, Exile The Second and Nidaime J Soul Brothers.

Kuroki is represented with LDH.

At the end of October 2022, he retired from the entertainment industry.

Participating groups

Filmography

※His roles in bold are his starring works

Stage

Films

TV dramas

Internet dramas

TV programmes

Internet programmes

Advertisements

Magazine serializations

Others

Productions

References

External links
 in Exile Official Website 
 

Japanese male dancers
People from Miyazaki Prefecture
1980 births
Living people
21st-century dancers
21st-century Japanese male actors
LDH (company) artists